Orwellion is a genus of beetles in the family Cerambycidae containing the following species:

 Orwellion fasciatum Skiles, 1985
 Orwellion gibbulum (Bates, 1880)
 Orwellion lineatum Skiles, 1985
 Orwellion occidentalis (Giesbert & Hovore, 1976)

References

Elaphidiini